King Mountain State Recreation Site is a state park along the Matanuska River near Chickaloon, Alaska. It features a campground and other visitor amenities. It is located immediately northeast of King Mountain, at mile 76 of the Glenn Highway.

External links
 King Mountain State Recreation Site - official site

Protected areas of Matanuska-Susitna Borough, Alaska
State parks of Alaska